A special election was held in  on November 23, 1796 to fill a vacancy left by the resignation of Absalom Tatom (DR) on June 1, 1796.  Tatom had, himself, been elected in a special election the previous year.

Election results

Strudwick took his seat on December 13, 1796

See also
 List of special elections to the United States House of Representatives

References

North Carolina 1796 04
North Carolina 1796 04
1796 04
North Carolina 04
United States House of Representatives 04
United States House of Representatives 1796 04